An automation surprise is an action that is performed by an automation system and is unexpected by the user.  A mode error can be a common cause of an automation surprise.  Automation surprise can be dangerous when it upsets the situational awareness of a control operator.

See also
Human factors
Air safety

External links
 

Industrial automation